Carlos del Rio (born August 28, 1959 in Mexico) is a distinguished professor of medicine at Emory University School of Medicine. He is also a professor of global health and epidemiology at the Rollins School of Public Health of Emory University, executive associate dean of Emory University School of Medicine at Grady Health System and co-director of the Emory Center for AIDS Research. He is a member of the National Academy of Medicine and was elected as its foreign secretary in 2020. In 2022, del Rio became president of the Infectious Diseases Society of America.

Early life and education
Del Rio received his medical degree from Universidad La Salle in his native Mexico in 1983. He then completed a residency in internal medicine and a fellowship in infectious diseases at Emory University.

Career
In 1989, del Rio returned to Mexico, where he served as executive director of the National AIDS Council of Mexico from 1992 to 1996. He returned to Emory in November 1996, where he began practicing in 1999. He served as chief of the Emory Medical Service at Grady Memorial Hospital from 2001 to 2009.

COVID-19 pandemic 
Del Rio has advised municipal, state, and national leaders during the COVID-19 pandemic. He was a member of an advisory council to Atlanta Mayor Keisha Lance Bottoms and led the COVID-19 Health & Safety Task Force for the Atlanta Opera. He was a consultant for Tyler Perry, helping design and implement protocols for Tyler Perry Studios productions. Del Rio appeared with Perry in “COVID-19 Vaccine and the Black Community: A Tyler Perry Special,” a half-hour news special that premiered on BET on January 28, 2021. 

Nationally, del Rio advises college athletic programs as a member of the NCAA COVID-19 Advisory Panel. He also serves on the national advisory committee of the COVID Collaborative, which focuses on developing consensus recommendations and engaging with U.S. leaders on effective policy and coronavirus response. 

Del Rio was an investigator on the Moderna COVID-19 vaccine clinical trial.

Research
Del Rio's research focuses on access to and use of healthcare services among Americans with HIV/AIDS.

References

External links

HIV/AIDS researchers
Living people
Emory University School of Medicine faculty
Mexican emigrants to the United States
1959 births
Members of the National Academy of Medicine